Kingswell is a suburb in the New Zealand city of Invercargill.

The suburb has had a high rate of deprivation since the closure of the Ocean Beach freezing works in 1991.

Demographics

Kingswell had a population of 3,516 at the 2018 New Zealand census, an increase of 126 people (3.7%) since the 2013 census, and an increase of 330 people (10.4%) since the 2006 census. There were 1,365 households. There were 1,704 males and 1,815 females, giving a sex ratio of 0.94 males per female, with 765 people (21.8%) aged under 15 years, 693 (19.7%) aged 15 to 29, 1,569 (44.6%) aged 30 to 64, and 492 (14.0%) aged 65 or older.

Ethnicities were 82.5% European/Pākehā, 22.7% Māori, 5.9% Pacific peoples, 3.8% Asian, and 1.6% other ethnicities (totals add to more than 100% since people could identify with multiple ethnicities).

The proportion of people born overseas was 8.8%, compared with 27.1% nationally.

Although some people objected to giving their religion, 56.1% had no religion, 31.1% were Christian, 0.8% were Hindu, 0.1% were Buddhist and 2.3% had other religions.

Of those at least 15 years old, 225 (8.2%) people had a bachelor or higher degree, and 876 (31.8%) people had no formal qualifications. 201 people (7.3%) earned over $70,000 compared to 17.2% nationally. The employment status of those at least 15 was that 1,422 (51.7%) people were employed full-time, 405 (14.7%) were part-time, and 117 (4.3%) were unemployed.

References

Suburbs of Invercargill